The Great Raid is a 2005 war film about the Raid at Cabanatuan on the island of Luzon, Philippines during World War II. It is directed by John Dahl and stars Benjamin Bratt, James Franco, Connie Nielsen, Marton Csokas, Joseph Fiennes with Motoki Kobayashi and Cesar Montano. The principal photography took place from July 4 to November 6, 2002, but its release was delayed several times from the original target of fall 2003. The film received mixed reviews from critics and was a commercial failure.

The film showcases the efforts of American soldiers and the Filipino resistance guerrilla, rescuing Allied prisoners of war from a Japanese POW camp.

Plot
In 1945, American forces were closing in on the Japanese-occupied Philippines. The Japanese held around 500 American prisoners who had survived the Bataan Death March in a notorious POW camp at Cabanatuan and subjected them to brutal treatment and summary execution, as the Japanese code of bushido viewed surrender as a disgrace. Many prisoners were also stricken with malaria.

The film opens with the massacre of prisoners of war on Palawan by the Kempeitai, the Imperial Japanese military's secret police (though it was committed by the Japanese Fourteenth Area Army).

At Lingayen Gulf, the 6th Ranger Battalion under Lieutenant-Colonel Henry Mucci is ordered by Lt. Gen. Walter Krueger to liberate all of the POWs at Cabanatuan prison camp before they are killed by the Japanese. The film chronicles the efforts of the Rangers, Alamo Scouts from the Sixth Army and Filipino guerrillas as they undertake the Raid at Cabanatuan.

Throughout the film, the viewpoint switches between the POWs at Cabanatuan, the Rangers, the Filipino resistance and the Japanese.

The film covers the resistance work undertaken by nurse Margaret Utinsky, who smuggled medicine into the POW camps. The Kempeitai arrested her and sent her to Fort Santiago prison. She was eventually released but spent six weeks recovering from gangrene as a result of injuries sustained from beatings. The movie ends with the prisoners being liberated.

Cast

 Benjamin Bratt as Lieutenant Colonel Henry Mucci
 James Franco as Captain Robert Prince
 Connie Nielsen as Margaret Utinsky
 Marton Csokas as Captain Redding
 Joseph Fiennes as Major Daniel Gibson
 Mark Consuelos as Corporal Guttierez
 Max Martini as 1st Sergeant Sid Wojo
 Logan Marshall-Green as Lieutenant Paul Colvin
 Robert Mammone as Captain Jimmy Fisher
 Cesar Montano as Captain Juan Pajota
 James Carpinello as Corporal Aliteri
 Clayne Crawford as Corporal Alridge
 Craig McLachlan as Lieutenant Riley
 Sam Worthington as Private First Class Lucas
 Kenny Doughty as Pitt
 Natalie Mendoza as Mina
 Paolo Montalbán as Sergeant Valera
 Masa Yamaguchi as Lieutenant Hikobe (Japanese: 陸軍中尉彦部, Rikugun-Chūi Hikobe
 Paul Nakauchi as Sergeant Shigeno (Japanese: 茂野軍曹, Shigeno Gunsō)
 Motoki Kobayashi as Major Nagai (Japanese: 陸軍少佐永井, Rikugun-Shōsa  Nagai)
 Laird Macintosh as Lieutenant O'Grady
 Jeremy Callaghan as Lieutenant Able
 Dale Dye as Lieutenant General Walter Krueger
 Brett Tucker as Major Robert Lapham
 Eugenia Yuan as Cora

 Ryan Eigenmann as Refugee Profiter

Filipino veteran actors Rez Cortez and Bembol Roco also made a cameo appearance.

Production notes

The Americans used a Northrop P-61 Black Widow night fighter to divert Japanese attention while the Rangers were crawling toward the camp; the aircraft used in the movie was a Lockheed Hudson, because none of the four surviving P-61s were airworthy when the film was made.

The movie was filmed in south-east Queensland, Australia utilising a huge, authentic recreation of a prisoner of war camp. In addition, numerous local Asian students were employed to play Japanese soldiers.

The movie was shot in 2002 but it was pulled from its original 2003 release schedule on several occasions. It was finally released in August 2005, by Miramax Films, which coincided with the formal departure of co-founders Bob and Harvey Weinstein from the company.

James Franco wrote about the making of the movie in his novel Actors Anonymous.

Reception
As of August 2014, the film had a score of 48 out of 100 on Metacritic based on 29 reviews. , on Rotten Tomatoes, the film had an approval rating of 38%, based on 119 reviews with an average score of 5.32/10. The consensus on Rotten Tomatoes was that the film was too long with too many subplots, although the actual raid was exciting. However, it received more praise from Chicago Sun-Times critic Roger Ebert, who gave it three stars.

Ebert praised the film, saying, "Here is a war movie that understands how wars are actually fought." He continued, "[The film] has been made with the confidence that the story itself is the point, not the flashy graphics. The raid is outlined for the troops (and for the audience), so that, knowing what the rescuers want to do, we understand how they're trying to do it. Like soldiers on a march, it puts one step in front of another, instead of flying apart into a blizzard of quick cuts and special effects. Like the jazzier but equally realistic Black Hawk Down, it shows a situation that has moved beyond policy and strategy and amounts to soldiers in the field, hoping to hell they get home alive." He also said the film gave "full credit" to the Filipino guerrillas who assisted the Rangers. He concluded, "it is good to have a film that is not about entertainment for action fans, but about how wars are won with great difficulty, risk, and cost."

Wesley Morris of The Boston Globe criticized a lack of character development and the pace of the film, saying, "On screen, at least, the raid to free the prisoners isn't all that great – just a bunch of explosions and combat maneuvers. Still, it's the one sequence in the film where everybody works with the same conviction. The audience, meanwhile, has to sit around with the prisoners, waiting for this to happen. It's a long wait." He concluded that the film "amounts to a noble failure."

Stephen Hunter of The Washington Post praised the film as "a riveting, even inspirational account of an American feat of arms about which few know but about which many more should." He said the film was made more in the style of movies from the 1940s, with the hero being the unit involved in the action instead of individuals, a technique which is rarely used today and explains the "essentially starless" cast drawing mainly from television or film supporting roles. He praised its accuracy, saying, "The war stuff is first-rate all the way through. A great deal of effort has been made to achieve a level of anthropological correctness: The weapons are right, the uniforms are right, the equipment is right...The raid itself is a dynamo of action filmmaking, exactly like what the real thing must have been – swift and brutal, with a lot of shooting and no prisoner-taking."

Joel Selvin of the San Francisco Chronicle called the film "very boring"; a "story without irony, perspective or any leavening that would make it something other than an ordinary military-action caper. The story line is telegraphed from word one and the meticulous unfolding plot plods ahead inexorably without the slightest bit of suspense."

Roger Moore of the Orlando Sentinel said, "[The characters are] all real people, and much of this really happened. But director John Dahl (Joy Ride) and the screenwriters have conjured a dreary, old-fashioned 'last roundup' of war movie and prisoner-of-war movie cliches, small but forgivable sins. Less forgivable is how Dahl squanders tension for an hour and a half cutting between the suffering prisoners and resistance intrigues in Manila and the long march of the Rangers, and a fictionalized romance story that might have made a nice little movie by itself."

James Plath of Movie Metropolis wrote, "In many ways, The Great Raid adheres to the genre right down to the character types and before-battle thoughts, but it's also a curious combination of modern war tale in the manner of Saving Private Ryan and the kind of patriotic films that were made in the waning years of the war and in the fifties. It has both a realistic sheen, and an element of idealistic flag-waving. The Great Raid isn't a perfect film, but it's an engaging one, and, at times, a powerful one."

Scott Weinberg of DVD Talk gave it a positive review, and described the film as "truly an 'old-fashioned' war movie...based on, and adhering very closely to, actual events that occurred in early 1945[.] The Great Raid is not a hyper-kinetic flash-banger like Pearl Harbor, nor it is a cerebral rumination like The Thin Red Line; it's just a well-hewn and efficient re-telling of true story that's worthy of remembrance." He opined that the film was delayed not because it was bad, but because its old-fashioned style is a "tough sell...in today's marketplace."

Mike Clark of USA Today said, "Just about any golden age Hollywood hack could have made a zestier drama about one of the greatest rescue missions in U.S. military history," and criticized "Franco's droning voice-over" for spelling out "every sliver of historical context", and also said "a huge chunk of time is given to an uncompelling romance between a major...and a widowed nurse."

Entertainment Weekly said it "lacks a center. It's an exhausted sprawl with multiple story foci, none of them terribly compelling," concluding, "Dahl does vividly re-create that least heralded burden of war: the boredom."
Steven Rea of The Philadelphia Inquirer wrote, "The Great Raid, which documents the largest rescue mission in U.S. military history (and ends with archival footage of many of the real soldiers portrayed in the film), lacks the visceral sweep of Saving Private Ryan. But Spielberg's story, for all its gut-wrenching intensity, was a fiction. Dahl's movie, slower in pace and conscious of its own artifice, addresses the same issues of courage and sacrifice – and tells a true story. That's worth something. In fact, it's worth a lot."

Box office
The movie was a box-office bomb, covering only 12% of its $80 million budget. The Great Raid was released on August 12, 2005, and opened at #10 at the box office, gathering $3,376,009 in the opening weekend. Its worldwide gross stands at $10,769,311.

References

External links

History in the Movies: The Great Raid

2005 films
2005 drama films
2000s war drama films
American films based on actual events
American World War II films
American war drama films
Asian-American war films
Films about United States Army Rangers
Films based on multiple works
Films based on non-fiction books
Films shot at Village Roadshow Studios
Films directed by John Dahl
Films produced by Lawrence Bender
Films scored by Trevor Rabin
Films set in the 1940s
Films set in the Philippines
Films shot in Queensland
Japanese occupation of the Philippines films
Military history of the Philippines during World War II
Pacific War films
World War II films based on actual events
World War II prisoner of war films
2000s American films
Films about capital punishment